Class 40 may refer to:

British Rail Class 40
Electroputere LE5100, otherwise known as CFR Class 40/41/42
New South Wales 40 class locomotive
Class40, a class of monohull sailboat and a yacht primarily used for short handed offshore and coastal racing